Sonoma Valley's Larson Family Winery is on Sonoma Creek in the Los Carneros AVA of Sonoma County.

History
The site of the winery in the Schellville region of Sonoma Valley was first a ranch, then later the site of the Sonoma Rodeo. 
 The land has been in the family for generations  and is where notable horse trainer Buster Millerick who worked with Seabiscuit learned to ride.

Winery
Larson Family Winery has produced many award winning wines. A few of these include their 2008 Late Harvest Carneros Gewürtztraminer, which won gold in the 2011 SF Chronicle Wine Competition, and the 2009 Pinot noir Rose won 90 points and a Silver Medal at the California State Fair and the 2008 Late Harvest Carneros Gewürztraminer won gold in the 2011 SF Chronicle Wine Competition.

References

External links
 

Wineries in Sonoma County
1987 establishments in California